U.S. Route 29 (US 29) in the state of Georgia, is a north–south United States Numbered Highway that runs southwest to northeast from West Point at the Alabama state line to the South Carolina state line, near Lake Hartwell. From West Point to downtown Atlanta, the Georgia Department of Transportation (GDOT) has cosigned US 29 with State Route 14 (SR 14). North of downtown Atlanta, the route runs along SR 8 to Dacula and again from west of Statham to the South Carolina state line.

Concurrencies of US 29 with US routes in Georgia include US 27 in LaGrange as well as US 27 ALT from Moreland to Newnan. Others include US 19/US 41 from Castleberry Hill to the vicinity of Georgia Tech in Atlanta, US 78 from Georgia Tech to Scottdale, and again from near Bogart to Athens, US 278 from Georgia Tech to Druid Hills, US 23 from east Atlanta, to Decatur, and US 129/US 441 in the vicinity of Athens.

Route description

the following portions of US 29 in Georgia are part of the National Highway System, a system of routes determined to be the most important for the nation's economy, mobility, and defense:
The concurrency with US 27/SR 1 in LaGrange
From I-85 just south of East Newnan to SR 34 in Newnan
From SR 74 in Fairburn to US 29 Alt./SR 14 Alt./SR 14 Conn. in Red Oak
From I-20 in Atlanta to the intersection with Jimmy Carter Boulevard and Mountain Industrial Boulevard in Tucker
From US 29 Bus./SR 8/SR 316 just west of Dacula to SR 72 in Athens

History
Former sections of the road have included local streets named "Old Highway 29" in various locations as well as Broad Street (GA 14 Connector) in LaGrange and U.S. Route 29 Business between Dacula and west of Statham. Other former segments include Old West Point Road south of LaGrange, Wynne-Russell Drive in Lilburn, Old Athens Road in Lawrenceville, Sam Groves Street in Danielsville, Old Royston Road in Bluestone, and Franklin Springs Circle in Royston.

Parts of US 29 to the southwest of Atlanta has been named Roosevelt Highway, since Franklin D. Roosevelt made his final journey northward from Warm Springs along this stretch of highway. Large crowds gathered along US 29 on this day in April 1945 to pay their final respects to the deceased President. Unfortunately for those who waited along the highway they missed seeing the president's body being transported back to Washington on a train that ran on nearby tracks.

Major intersections

See also
 
 
 Special routes of U.S. Route 29

References

External links

U.S. Highway 29 & Georgia 8 (AARoads.com)
29  US 29 (Georgia Highways)
US 29 in Georgia (Mile-by-Mile)

 Georgia
29
Transportation in Troup County, Georgia
Transportation in Coweta County, Georgia
College Park, Georgia
Roads in Atlanta
Druid Hills, Georgia
Decatur, Georgia
Tucker, Georgia
Transportation in Gwinnett County, Georgia
Transportation in Athens, Georgia
Transportation in Madison County, Georgia
Transportation in Hart County, Georgia